The 1998 Sparkassen Cup on Ice was the third event of six in the 1998–99 ISU Grand Prix of Figure Skating, a senior-level international invitational competition series. It was held in Gelsenkirchen on November 12–15. Medals were awarded in the disciplines of men's singles, ladies' singles, pair skating, and ice dancing. Skaters earned points toward qualifying for the 1998–99 Grand Prix Final.

Results

Men

Ladies

Pairs

Ice dancing

External links
 1998 Sparkassen Cup on Ice
 ISU Grand Prix 1998/99

Sparkassen Cup On Ice, 1998
Bofrost Cup on Ice